The Diocese of Cartagena is the diocese of the city of Cartagena in the Ecclesiastical province of Granada in Spain.

History
 1st century: Established as Diocese of Cartagena

Reports of Sex Abuse
On 18 May 2020, Cartagena Bishop José Manuel Lorca Planes announced the start of an "important inquiry" into sex abuse allegations spanning from 1950 to 2010. At least eight potential victims have publicly come forward, and Lorca urged more accusers to publicly come forward as well.

Special churches
Minor Basilicas:
Basílica de la Purísima Concepción, Yecla (Murcia), Región de Murcia

Leadership
 Bishops of Cartagena (Roman rite)
. . .
Pedro Gallego, O.F.M. (1241–1267 Died)
. . .
Nicolás Yáñez Gutiérrez de Aguilar (4 Aug 1361 – 1372 Died)
. . .
Rodrigo de Borja (8 Jul 1482 – 11 Aug 1492 Elected, Pope)
Bernardino López de Carvajal y Sande (27 Mar 1493 – 2 Feb 1495 Appointed, Bishop of Sigüenza)
Juan Ruiz de Medina (20 Feb 1495 – 1502 Appointed, Bishop of Segovia)
Juan Daza (16 Mar 1502 – 4 Nov 1504 Appointed,  Bishop of Córdoba)
Juan Fernández Velasco (4 Nov 1505 Appointed – 22 Dec 1505 Appointed, Bishop of Calahorra y La Calzada)
Martín Fernández de Angulo Saavedra y Luna (22 Dec 1508 – 30 Sep 1510, Appointed, Bishop of Córdoba)
Matthäus Lang von Wellenburg (30 Sep 1510 – 30 Mar 1540 Died)
Juan Martínez Silíceo (23 Feb 1541 – 8 Jan 1546 Appointed, Archbishop of Toledo)
Esteban Almeida (16 Apr 1546 – 23 Mar 1563 Died)
Gonzalo Arias Gallego (22 Aug 1565 – 28 Apr 1575 Died)
Gómez Zapata (11 Apr 1576 – 8 Nov 1582 Appointed, Bishop of Cuenca)
Jerónimo Manrique de Lara (19 Jan 1583 – 5 Apr 1591 Appointed, Bishop of Ávila)
Sancho Dávila Toledo (26 Apr 1591 – 10 Jan 1600 Appointed, Bishop of Jaén)
Juan de Zúñiga Flores (24 Jan 1600 Appointed – 20 Dec 1602 Died)
Alfonso Coloma (13 Jan 1603 – 20 Apr 1608 Died)
Francisco Martínez de Cenicero (13 Aug 1607 – 3 Aug 1615 Appointed, Bishop of Jaén)
Francisco González Zárate (de Gamarra) (17 Aug 1615 – 30 May 1616 Appointed, Bishop of Ávila)
Alfonso Márquez de Prado (18 Jul 1616 – 9 Jul 1618 Appointed, Bishop of Segovia)
Antonio Trejo de Sande Paniagua, O.F.M. (9 Jul 1618 – 21 Dec 1636 Died)
Francisco de Manso Zuñiga y Sola  (5 Oct 1637 – 8 Oct 1640 Appointed, Archbishop of Burgos)
Mendo de Benavides (19 Nov 1640 – 17 Oct 1644 Died)
Juan Vélez de Valdivielso (21 Aug 1645 – 1 Jul 1648 Died)
Diego Martínez Zarzosa (1 Mar 1649 – 31 Jan 1656 Appointed, Bishop of Málaga)
Andrés Bravo de Salamanca (18 Sep 1656 – 13 Mar 1662 Appointed, Bishop of Sigüenza)
Juan Bravo Lasprilla (31 Jul 1662 – 17 Aug 1663 Died)
Mateo de Sagade de Bugueyro (28 Jan 1664 – 26 Aug 1672 Died)
Francisco de Rojas-Borja y Artés (29 May 1673 – 17 Jul 1684 Died)
Antonio Medina Cachon y Ponce de Leon (5 Feb 1685 – 20 Sep 1694 Died)
Máximo Francisco Joániz de Echalaz (16 May 1695 – 17 Nov 1695 Died)
Francisco Fernández de Angulo (18 Jun 1696 – 29 Sep 1704 Died)
Luis Antonio Belluga y Moncada, C.O. (9 Feb 1705 – 11 Sep 1724 Resigned)
Tomás José Ruiz Montes (11 Sep 1724 – 11 Dec 1741 Died)
Juan Mateo López Sáenz, C.R.M. (9 Jul 1742 – 14 Oct 1752 Died)
Diego Rojas y Contreras (12 Mar 1753 – 10 Nov 1772 Died)
Manuel Rubín y Celis (15 Mar 1773 – 9 Aug 1784 Died)
Manuel Felipe Miralles (27 Jun 1785 – 15 Jul 1788 Died)
Victoriano López Gonzalo (14 Dec 1789 – 21 Nov 1805 Died)
José Jiménez (31 Mar 1806 – 1 Dec 1820 Died)
Antonio Posada Rubín de Celis (29 Jun 1821 – 18 Mar 1825 Resigned)
José Antonio Azpeitia y Sáenz de Santamaria (19 Dec 1824 – 1 Nov 1840 Died)
Mariano Benito Barrio Fernández (17 Dec 1847 – 18 Jun 1861 Confirmed, Archbishop of Valencia)
Francisco Landeira y Sevilla (22 Jul 1861 – 16 Sep 1876 Died)
Diego Mariano Alguacil y Rodríguez (18 Dec 1876 – 10 Jan 1884 Died)
Tomás Bryan y Livermore (10 Nov 1884 Appointed – 11 Sep 1902 Died)
Vicente Alonso y Salgado, Sch. P. (25 Jun 1903 – Jun 1930 Died)
Miguel de los Santos Díaz y Gómara (28 Jan 1935 – 7 Nov 1949 Died)
Ramón Sanahuja y Marcé (13 May 1950 – 22 Apr 1969 Retired)
Miguel Roca Cabanellas (22 Apr 1969 – 25 May 1978 Appointed, Archbishop of Valencia)
Javier Azagra Labiano (23 Sep 1978 – 20 Feb 1998 Retired)
Manuel Ureña Pastor (1 Jul 1998 – 2 Apr 2005 Appointed, Archbishop of Zaragoza)
Juan Antonio Reig Pla (24 Sep 2005 – 7 Mar 2009 Appointed, Bishop of Alcala)
José Manuel Lorca Planes (18 Jul 2009 – )

See also

Roman Catholicism in Spain

Sources

 GCatholic.org
 Catholic Hierarchy
  Diocese website

Roman Catholic dioceses in Spain
Dioceses established in the 1st century
 
Diocese of Cartagena